Kuara (also known as Kisiga, Ku'ara, modern Tell al-Lahm site, Dhi Qar Governorate, Iraq) is an archaeological site in Dhi Qar Province (Iraq). According to the Sumerian King List, Kuara was also the home of Dumuzid, the fisherman, the legendary third king of Uruk . The city's patron deity was Meslamtaea (Nergal). In Sumerian mythology, Kuara was also considered the birthplace of the god Marduk (Asarluhi), Enki's son. The cults of Marduk and Ninehama were centered in Kuara.

History of archaeological research
The location was excavated for a few days in 1855 by J. E. Taylor. He found a few inscribed bricks, and a single cuneiform tablet. While working at Eridu for the British Museum in 1918, R. Campbell Thompson excavated there briefly finding bricks of Nabonidus and Bur-Sin . In more modern times, Fuad Safar conducted soundings at Kuara.

Kuara and its environment
In modern times the Euphrates is about 25 kilometers away. The site, with the extent of 350 meters by 300 meters, consists of two tells or settlement mounds, with some peripheral ridges, near a dry canal bed. One mound rises to about 15 meters while the other to about 2 meters.

Occupation history
Kuara was established ca. 2500 BC, during the Sumerian Early Dynastic II period. It was a seaport to the Persian Gulf, and traded with the port of Dilmun. In 709 BC, the Assyrian king Sargon II was trying to capture Marduk-apal-iddina II, who fled to Kuara, whereupon Sargon's army laid siege and destroyed the city. Alluvial soil carried by the Euphrates continually extended the land farther into the Persian Gulf; thus the modern site is far from the sea, even though it was a sea port 4500 years ago.

See also
Cities of the Ancient Near East

References

Further reading
H. W. F. Saggs, "A cylinder from Tell Al-Laham", Sumer, 13 (1957), pp. 190–195

External links
Recent Tell al-Lahm site photographs - British Museum

Sumerian cities
Archaeological sites in Iraq
Former populated places in Iraq
Dhi Qar Governorate